Make it Reign may refer to:

Make It Reign (album) by American rap duo Lord Tariq and Peter Gunz 1998
"Make it Reign" (Face Off), 2013 episode of Face Off
"Make it Reign" (Supergirl), 2017 episode of Supergirl

See also 
Make It Rain (disambiguation)